Marvin René González Leiva (born April 17, 1982) is a Salvadoran former footballer who played as a left-back.

Club career
Born in El Refugio, González came through the reserves of FAS in 2001 to claim his place in the senior team and to stay in there for almost a decade.

On July 2, 2010, González signed a two-year contract with Águila, starting with the Apertura 2010 season. Marvin González returned to FAS for the Apertura 2011. In 2013, he was released by FAS and Later sign with Santa Tecla F.C.

International career
González made his debut for El Salvador in a November 2002 friendly match against the United States and had, as of May 2011, earned a total of 82 caps, scoring 1 goal. He has represented his country in 22 FIFA World Cup qualification matches and played at the 2003, 2005, 2009 UNCAF Nations Cups and 2011 Copa Centroamericana. As well as at the 2003, 2009 and 2011 CONCACAF Gold Cups. González has received a total of 83 caps making him the top second capped player for El Salvador before Leonel Cárcamo (84 caps).

International goals

References

External links
 
 El Gráfico Profile 

1982 births
Living people
People from Ahuachapán Department
Association football defenders
Salvadoran footballers
El Salvador international footballers
2003 UNCAF Nations Cup players
2003 CONCACAF Gold Cup players
2005 UNCAF Nations Cup players
2009 UNCAF Nations Cup players
2009 CONCACAF Gold Cup players
2011 Copa Centroamericana players
2011 CONCACAF Gold Cup players
C.D. FAS footballers
C.D. Águila footballers
Sportspeople involved in betting scandals
Sportspeople banned for life